The Misfortunates is a 2009 Belgian comedy-drama film directed by Felix Van Groeningen. It is adapted from the 2006 semi-autobiographical novel of the same name by Belgian writer Dimitri Verhulst. The film stars Kenneth Vanbaeden, Valentijn Dhaenens, Koen De Graeve, Wouter Hendrickx, Johan Heldenbergh, Bert Haelvoet, and Gilda De Bal.

Synopsis 
In the 1980s, Gunther Strobbe (Kenneth Vanbaeden) is a thirteen-year-old boy living with his father, Celle (Koen De Graeve), his three uncles Petrol, Breeze, Koen, (Wouter Hendrickx, Johan Heldenbergh, and Bert Haelvoet respectively) and his mother Meetje (Gilda De Bal). Celle works part-time as a postman, while his brothers are boozing layabouts who live off their mother's pension. The men of this family spend their days drinking beer and eating sausage, breaking things, playing pranks on people, and chasing women. In the present day, Gunther has made a career as a writer when his girlfriend suddenly falls pregnant with a son—apprehensive of his new responsibilities, Gunther seeks out his father and his uncles for some advice on fatherhood.

Cast 
  as 13-year-old Gunther Strobbe
  as 33-year-old Gunther Strobbe
 Koen De Graeve as Marcel ‘Celle’ Strobbe
  as Lowie ‘Petrol’ Strobbe
 Johan Heldenbergh as Pieter ‘Breeze’ Strobbe
  as Koen Strobbe
  as Meetje
 Pauline Grossen as Aunt Rosie
 Sofie Palmers as Cousin Sylvie

Critical reception 
The chief film critic of The New York Times, Manohla Dargis, wrote: "The revelation of the adult Gunther’s thinking and being — he’s callous, near brutal to his girlfriend — is extremely well managed and shows just how subtle this loud, seemingly rough tale really is." Variety described the film as starting out as an "extremely lowbrow comedy" but later "morphing into a bittersweet meditation on whether familial love and pride are enough to sustain a proper upbringing." LA Weekly compared the film to mixing "the visual exuberance of Trainspotting with the familial pathos of Angela’s Ashes".

Accolades
The film won the Prix Art et Essai at Cannes Film Festival in the Director's Fortnight section. The film was the official Belgian entry for the 82nd Academy Awards in 2010 in the category of Best Foreign Language Film.

See also
 List of submissions to the 82nd Academy Awards for Best Foreign Language Film
 List of Belgian submissions for the Academy Award for Best Foreign Language Film

References

External links
 
 
 
 

2009 films
Belgian comedy-drama films
2000s Dutch-language films
Films based on Belgian novels
Films directed by Felix van Groeningen
Films set in Belgium
Films shot in Belgium